The Barber Shop (1933) is a short American pre-Code comedy film starring W.C. Fields, directed by Arthur Ripley, and produced by Mack Sennett.

Cast List
 W. C. Fields ... Cornelius O'Hare
 Elise Cavanna ... Mrs. O'Hare
 Harry Watson ... Ronald O'Hare
 Dagmar Oakland ... Hortense - Manicurist
 Frank Alexander ... Steam Room Victim - Before (uncredited)
 Billy Bletcher ... Steam Room Victim - After (uncredited)
 Joe Bordeaux ... Passerby (uncredited)
 Harry Bowen ... Cop (uncredited)
 Fay Holderness ... Little Girl's Mother (uncredited)
 William McCall ... Man with Horse (uncredited)
 Cyril Ring ... Escaped Bank Robber (uncredited)
 Dick Rush ... Cop (uncredited)
 John Sinclair ... Mr. Flugg - Shave Customer (billed as John St. Clair)

External links
 

Paramount Pictures short films
1933 films
American black-and-white films
1933 comedy films
Films with screenplays by W. C. Fields
American comedy short films
Films directed by Arthur Ripley
1930s English-language films
1930s American films